Berkhart may refer to:

 Benjamin Berkhart, a fictional character in the television series The Time Tunnel
 Berkhart (Battle B-Daman), a fictional character in the anime and manga series Battle B-Daman
 Daniel Berkhart, a Marvel Comics supervillain